Asian Highway 70 (AH70)  is a road in the Asian Highway Network running  from Donetsk, Russia (near the Ukrainian border) to Bandarabbas, Iran. The route is as follows:

Russia
: border with Ukraine (de facto under LNR control) - Kamensk-Shakhtinsky - Volgograd
: Volgograd - Astrakhan
12A-235: Astrakhan - Krasny Yar - border with Kazakhstan

Kazakhstan
: Kotyaevka - Atyrau - Dossor
: Dossor - Beyneu - Zhetybay - Aktau
: Zhetybai - Zhanaozen

Turkmenistan
 Bekdash - Turkmenbashi - Serdar
 Serdar - Garrygala - Incheh Borun

Iran
: Incheh Borun - Gorgan
: Gorgan - Sari
: Sari - Damghan - Robat-e Posht-e Badam
: Robat-e Posht-e Badam - Yazd
: Yazd - Anar - Bandarabbas

References

External links 

 Iran road map on Young Journalists Club

Asian Highway Network

Roads in Russia
Roads in Kazakhstan
Roads in Turkmenistan
Roads in Iran